Ampelozizyphus is a genus of plants in the family Rhamnaceae.  It includes two species Ampelozizyphus amazonicus, which is known from Amazonian Peru, Colombia, Venezuela, Guyana, Suriname, French Guiana, and Brazil, and Ampelozizyphus guaquirensis, native to the central portion of the Coastal Cordillera of Venezuela.

External links

Rhamnaceae
Rhamnaceae genera
Flora of Brazil
Taxa named by Adolpho Ducke